HR 6875, previously known as Sigma Telescopii, is a single star in the constellation Corona Australis. It has a blue-white hue and is dimly visible to the naked eye with an apparent visual magnitude of 5.24. This object is located at a distance of approximately 550 light years from the Sun based on parallax. It is listed as a member of the Sco OB2 association.

This is a hot B-type main-sequence star with a stellar classification of B3 V. It is around 103 million years old and is spinning rapidly with a projected rotational velocity of 248 km/s or perhaps higher. The star has six times the mass of the Sun and about four times the Sun's radius. It is radiating more than a thousand times the luminosity of the Sun from its photosphere at an effective temperature of 20,350 K.

A magnitude 10.13 visual companion is located at an angular separation of  along a position angle of 162°.

References

B-type main-sequence stars
Scorpius–Centaurus association

Corona Australis
Telescopii, Sigma
Durchmusterung objects
168905
090200
6875